The Huansu S6 is a 5-seat Compact SUV produced by Huansu, a sub-brand of BAIC Motor and Yinxiang Group.

Overview

The Huansu S6 is manufactured by Beiqi Yinxiang Automobile. Based on the same platform as the Senova X65, the Huansu S6 was officially launched in September 2015, with prices ranging from 88,800 yuan to 116,800 yuan.

References

External links 

 Official Website

Cars introduced in 2015
Crossover sport utility vehicles
front-wheel-drive vehicles
Cars of China